Marufo or Mourisco tinto is a red Portuguese wine grape that is planted primarily in the Douro DOC. It is a recommended grape in Port wine production.

Synonyms
Marufo is also known under the synonyms Abrunhal, Barrete De Padre, Brujidera, Crujidera, Lagrima Noir, Malvasia, Marouco, Marufa, 
Marujo, Morisco tinto, Mourico, Mourisca, Mourisco, Mourisco Du Douro, Mourisco Preto, Mourisco tinto, Tinta Amarela Grossa, Tinta Do Caramelo, and Tinta Grossa.

References

Red wine grape varieties